Delvinë ( or); is a town and a municipality in Vlorë County, southern Albania,  northeast of Saranda. It was formed in the 2015 local government reform by the merger of the former municipalities Delvinë and Vergo, which became municipal units. The seat of the municipality is the town Delvinë. The population of the former municipality in the 2011 census was 5,754.

The town is built on a mountain slope. It has a mosque, a Catholic church, a Protestant church, and an Orthodox church. Nearby are the remainders of a medieval castle. To the southwest of the city is the site of ancient Phoenice, which was declared an Archaeological Park in 2005.

The town's population consists of a majority of Albanians and a substantial Greek minority. Other communities include Balkan Egyptians and until WWII, Jews. There is little local employment apart from that provided by the state, and Delvinë benefits little from the tourist boom in Saranda.

Etymology 

The Albanian toponym Delvinë is connected to the Albanian dele, delmë, meaning 'sheep'. Linguist Xhelal Ylli translates Delvinë as 'white sheep'.

History 

In antiquity the region was inhabited by the Ancient Greek tribe of the Chaonians. In the Middle Ages, Delvinë was part of the Despotate of Epirus. After defeat of the Slavic tribes in 616, when they unsuccessfully besieged Thessaloniki, one of the tribes (Vajunites) migrated to Epirus. Until the 14th century this region in Epirus was referred to as Vanegetia, from the name of this Slavic tribe. Similar toponyms like Viyanite or Viyantije survived until the 16th century when they were replaced with the name Delvinë.

Ottoman period 

The separate Sanjak of Delvina was established in the mid-16th century due to the need to secure Ottoman control in the region towards potential Venetian infiltration from nearby Butrinto and to control the rebellious zone of Himara. The county town was Delvinë, yet during the 18th century the local Pasha moved the seat of the sanjak from Delvinë to Gjirokastër. The official name did not change, however, as it was also referred to as the Sanjak of Gjirokastër.

In an ecclesiastical entry of 1635, the Codex of the church of Delvinë written in Greek noted that the Muslim population had increased and dwelt in quarters inhabited by Orthodox Christians, had confiscated their churches and converted them into mosques, thereby forcing the non-Islamized Christians to move to other quarters of the town. The Turkish traveler Evliya Çelebi visited Delvinë around 1670 and gave information about the city in his travel book. He reported that in the Middle Ages Delvinë was in the hands of the Spanish and later the Venetians. In his own time, Ajaz Mehmet Pasha – a native Albanian – governed the Sanjak-bey of Delvinë. The sanjak covered 24 zeamets and 155 timars. There was a Turkish garrison, whose command on the castle was from Delvinë. According to the description of Çelebi, the small fortress had a good cistern, an ammunition depot and a small mosque. In the city there were about 100 brick-built houses. These stood relatively far apart and nearly every house had a tower. He noted that a town wall was missing. There were several mosques, three medreses and about 80 stores, as well as an open market place. Çelebi also observed that during this time, all the inhabitants of Delvinë spoke the Albanian language while having no knowledge of the Greek language. In an ecclesiastical entry of 1730, the Codex of the church of Delvinë noted that some of the Christian Greek clergy had linguistic difficulties in administrating their congregations, as there were Christian villagers living within the region of Delvinë who were Albanian-speaking. The local diaspora in Venice as part of the Venetian Greek community's Brotherhood of Saint Nicholas financially supported various initiatives for the expansion of Greek education in the 18th century. Thus, in two instances in 1713 and 1749, Spyros Stratis and Spyridon Rizos respectively, notable members of the local diaspora in Venice, financially supported the expansion of the local Greek education system, as well as donating vast sums of money to local Orthodox monasteries and churches.
Delvinë was seized by Ali Pashë Tepelena in 1784. Delvinë was taken over by Albanian rebels in 1833 causing the Ottoman government to comply to the rebel requests. In 1847, when an Albanian uprising broke out, 500 men led by Zenel Gjoleka took over Delvinë.
In 1878 a Greek rebellion broke out, with a unit of 700 revolutionaries, mostly Epirotes, taking control of Sarandë and Delvinë. However, it was suppressed by the Ottoman troops, who burned 20 villages of the region. In September 1912, the Greek Band of Ioannis Poutetsis was defeated by Albanian groups and a Turkish detachment in the vicinity of Delvinë, and Poutetsis was killed.

Modern period
During the Balkan Wars and the subsequent Ottoman defeat, the Greek Army entered the city on March 3, 1913. In June 1914 the town hosted the constituent assembly of the representatives of Northern Epirus that discussed and finally approved the Protocol of Corfu, on July 26, 1914. Delvino then became part of the short-lived Autonomous Republic of Northern Epirus.

In World War II the city was controlled by the advancing Greek forces of the 3rd division in the initial stage of the Greco-Italian War (1940–1941).

Demography 

In the early 19th century during the rule of Ali Pasha, British diplomat William Martin Leake arrived in town on December 24, 1804. According to him, the town had an Albanian Muslim majority who had eight or ten small mosques. The Greeks occupied the eastern suburbs called Láka and consisted of about thirty families, ten of whom had the surname Kanáki.
	
The town has a majority population of Albanians alongside communities of Greeks and Balkan Egyptians. According to the Human Rights Watch, Greeks constituted 50% of the town's population in 1989 (~4000 individuals), but this fell to 25% (500) in 1999. According to fieldwork by Kallivretakis (1995), the town had an Albanian majority and populations of Albanians (Muslims and Christians) and Greeks. The villages Rusan, Vllahat, Bamatata, Kopaçezë, Varfaj were inhabited by Albanians. Greeks lived  in two villages of the municipality, Lefterhor and Kakodhik, while Vlachs in one village Vana. 

The population of the city alone in the 2011 census was 5,754 and the total registered population  of the same year was 14,218. With the administrative addition of Vergo in the municipal reform in 2015, the total resident population of Delvinë municipality was 7,598 and the total registered population was 18,074. Apart from Albanians, according to a 2014 report by the Albanian government, there were 2,300 Greeks in the number of total registered citizens in the municipality of Delvinë.

According to the 2011 census, Albanians constituted approximately 66% of the total population, Greeks constituted approximately 6% of the total population, Roma 0,25%, with the remainder not being registered. In the 2011 census, Albanian was recorded as the mother tongue of  ~95% of the population, ~4% Greek, 0.02% Macedonian
During the procedure organizations of the Greek minority and Albanian nationalist parties called for a boycott. Indeed the census results were affected by boycott by a significant number of the Greek community. According to the Advisory Committee on the Framework Convention for the Protection of National Minorities, the 2011 census is unreliable, inaccurate, and incompatible with established standards for the protection of national minorities. As of 2014, there are 134 students in the municipality of Delvinë who are enrolled in Greek-language education.

Until the Second World War, a small Jewish community existed in Delvinë. It consisted of Jews from Spain who had come to Delvinë when under Ottoman rule and had close connections to the large Jewish community in Ioannina. After the war, nearly all the Jews emigrated to Israel.

Education 
The first school in Delvina, a Greek-language school, was founded in 1537, when the town was still under Venetian control, and was maintained by bequests from wealthy local families. Moreover, in 1875 a Greek female school was founded.

Notable people
Themistoklis Bamichas, Greek politician and representative of Northern Epirus at the Paris Peace Conference of 1919
Xhorxhian Boçi, Albanian footballer
Avni bej Delvina, bej of the city, one of the signatories of the Albanian Declaration of Independence
Sulejman Delvina, fifth Prime Minister of Albania
Limoz Dizdari, Albanian composer
Sabri Godo, Albanian writer and politician
Abdyl bej Koka, Albanian bey and patriot of the mid-19th century
Ayas Mehmed Pasha, 15th-century Albanian vezir of the Ottoman Empire
Koço Qendro, Albanian actor
Hajrie Rondo, Albanian actress
Ecumenical Patriarch Serapheim II of Constantinople, Greek cleric and Ecumenical Patriarch of Constantinople
Laert Vasili, Greek-Albanian actor and director

See also 
 Finiq
Vllahat

References

Further reading 
Themistoklis Bamichas (1930). "Codex of the Church of the city of Delvina ". Ἠπειρωτικὰ Χρονικά, 5. pp. 56–75. (Greek)

Delvinë
Greek communities in Albania
Municipalities in Vlorë County
Administrative units of Delvinë
Towns in Albania
Epirus
Labëria